Crom or CROM may refer to:

Places
 Crom, a townland in County Fermanagh, Northern Ireland
 Crom Estate, a Northern Irish National Trust Property
 Crom Castle
 Ben Crom, a mountain in the Mourne Mountains in County Down, Northern Ireland
 Croom Castle or Crom Castle, a castle in Croom, County Limerick, Ireland

Fiction and folklore
 Crom Cruach, a deity of pre-Christian Ireland
 Crom Dubh, a mythological and folkloric figure of Ireland
 Crom, a fictional character in the 1982 film Tron played by Peter Jurasik
 Crom (fictional deity), a fictional deity in the Conan the Barbarian world
 Crom, a coal mining settlement in the Dragonriders of Pern science fiction series

People
 Rick Crom (born 1957), American actor, singer, comedian, lyricist, and composer
 Crom Ua Donnubáin or Crom O'Donovan (died 1254), the ancestor of O'Donovans later found in Carbery in County Cork,

Sports
 The Adelaide Crows, an Australian rules football club that plays in the AFL

Other uses
 Confederación Regional Obrera Mexicana (Regional Confederation of Mexican Workers), a federation of labor unions in Mexico

See also
 Croom, County Limerick, Ireland
 Ronan Le Crom (born 1974), French football goalkeeper
 Chrom, a character in the Fire Emblem series